The Doors of Perception is a live album by American jazz vibraphonist Dave Pike which was recorded in 1966 and released on the Vortex label in 1970.

Critical reception

The Allmusic site awarded the album 3½ stars stating "this is the Pike version of an acid experiment....Though only 27 minutes long, the impression of this disc will stay with listeners long after the record ends. ...While The Doors of Perception may not be every Pike fan's cup of what have you, it will certainly appeal to those who dug his sides for the German MPS label in the early '70s".

Track listing
All compositions by Dave Pike
 "Free Improvisation" – 3:06
 "The Drifter" – 7:09
 "The Doors of Perception" – 3:29
 "Ballad" – 5:30
 "Anticipation" – 8:05

Personnel 
 Dave Pike – vibraphone, marimba
 Lee Konitz – alto saxophone
 Eddie Daniels – tenor saxophone, clarinet
 Don Friedman – piano
 Chuck Israels – bass, electric bass
 Arnie Wise – drums

References 

1970 live albums
Dave Pike live albums
Vortex Records live albums
Albums recorded at the Village Gate